Timothy Corrigan may refer to:

 Timothy J. Corrigan (born 1956), American lawyer and judge
 Timothy Corrigan (interior designer), American interior designer